The Gabon – São Tomé and Príncipe Maritime Border Agreement is a 2001 treaty between Gabon and São Tomé and Príncipe which delimits the maritime boundary between the two countries.

The agreement was signed in São Tomé on 26 April 2001. The boundary set out by the text of the treaty is a relatively straight north–south line and is explicitly defined as an equidistant line between the islands of São Tomé and Príncipe and mainland Gabon. The boundary consists of five straight-line maritime segments defined by six individual coordinate points. The theoretical tripoint in the north—with Equatorial Guinea—and the theoretical tripoint in the south—with Cameroon—have not yet been established between the involved states.

The treaty is not yet in force because it has not yet been ratified by both countries. The full name of the treaty is Agreement on the Delimitation of the Maritime Border between the Gabonese Republic and the Democratic Republic of São Tomé and Príncipe.

Notes

References
 Charney, Jonathan I., David A. Colson, Robert W. Smith. (2005). International Maritime Boundaries, 5 vols. Hotei Publishing: Leiden. ; ; ; ; ;  OCLC 23254092

External links
Full text of agreement

2001 in Gabon
2001 in São Tomé and Príncipe
Boundary treaties
Gabon–São Tomé and Príncipe border
Treaties of Gabon
Treaties of São Tomé and Príncipe
Treaties concluded in 2001
United Nations treaties